David Rostomovich Khakhaleishvili (28 February 1971 – 11 January 2021) was a heavyweight Georgian judoka,  mixed martial artist and Olympic gold medalist. He was born in Kutaisi.

Career
Khakhaleishvili was expected to defend his heavyweight Olympic title at the 1996 Summer Olympics in Atlanta, U.S. in a highly anticipated match against the reigning world champion, David Douillet, but Khakhaleishvili and his coach went to the wrong location for weigh-ins and Khakhaleishvili was disqualified from the competition for failing to make weight.

Mixed martial-arts record

|-
|Loss
|align=center|1-2
|Yoshihiro Nakao
|TKO (submission to punches)
|K-1: Premium 2003 Dynamite!!
|
|align=center|2
|align=center|1:13
|Nagoya, Japan
|
|-
|Loss
|align=center|1-1
|Yoshihisa Yamamoto
|
|RINGS: Battle Dimensions Tournament 1996 Opening Round
|
|
|
|Japan
|Battle Dimensions Tournament 1996 Opening Round.
|-
| Win
| align=center|1-0
| Herman Renting
| 
| RINGS: Budokan Hall 1995
| 
| 
| 
| Tokyo, Japan
|

References

External links
 
 www.khakhaleishvili.org

1971 births
2021 deaths
Male judoka from Georgia (country)
Judoka at the 1992 Summer Olympics
Judoka at the 1996 Summer Olympics
Olympic judoka of the Unified Team
Olympic gold medalists for the Unified Team
Olympic judoka of Georgia (country)
Male mixed martial artists from Georgia (country)
Mixed martial artists utilizing judo
Sportspeople from Kutaisi
Olympic medalists in judo
Medalists at the 1992 Summer Olympics
Recipients of the Presidential Order of Excellence